Rose Arce is Executive Producer of Starfish Media Group, the production company of television journalist Soledad O'Brien. She was formerly a Senior Producer at CNN. Arce graduated from Barnard College in 1986. She shared a Pulitzer Prize with a colleague in 1992 while a reporter at New York Newsday, and has also won two Emmys for news reporting at WCBS-TV.

Awards

In 1991 Arce was a member of the staff that covered the 1991 Union Square derailment for New York Newsday. They won the 1992 Pulitzer Prize for Spot News Reporting for their "coverage of a midnight subway derailment in Manhattan that left five passengers dead and more than 200 injured."

Books

 Bebés Preciosos: 5001 Hispanic baby names (Avon Books, 1995) Arce and Maité Junco; 
 Latino in America (Celebra, 2009), Soledad O'Brien with Arce – publisher description: "the definitive tie-in to one of the most heavily anticipated CNN documentaries"
 The Next Big Story: my journey through the land of possibilities (New American Library, 2010), Soledad O'Brien with Arce

See also

 Hispanic and Latino American women in journalism
 LGBT culture in New York City
 List of LGBT people from New York City
 New Yorkers in journalism

References

External links
 

Living people
American television journalists
American television producers
American women television producers
Hispanic and Latino American women journalists
Pulitzer Prize for Breaking News Reporting winners
Emmy Award winners
Barnard College alumni
Year of birth missing (living people)
Place of birth missing (living people)
American women television journalists
21st-century American women